Maj. Frederick George Hindle (15 January 1848 – 1 March 1925) was a solicitor and Liberal Party politician in the United Kingdom, who served as Member of Parliament (MP) for the Darwen constituency in Lancashire from January 1910 to December 1910.

Background
Hindle was the son of John Hindle and Alice Chadwick. He was educated at Blackburn Grammar School. Senior Prizeman at Examination as Solicitor in 1870. In 1876 he married Helen Moulden Gillibrand. They had one son, Frederick Hindle, jun., who was also Liberal MP for Darwen.

Professional career
Hindle served 19 years as an officer in the East Lancashire Volunteers and retired with rank of Major. He practised as a solicitor in Manchester and at Darwen. From 1882 he was Clerk to Darwen Borough Justices. In 1883 he had published 'The Legal Status of Licensed Victuallers'.

Political career
Hindle was Liberal candidate for the Darwen division of Lancashire at the 1906 General Election missing out by 25 votes. He was Liberal candidate again at the January 1910 election and this time won by 211 votes. 
At the December election he lost by 215 votes. He was re-selected to contest Darwen for the Liberals for a general election expected to take place in 1915. However, due to the outbreak of war, the election was postponed until 1918. By then he had been replaced as Liberal candidate by his son. He did not stand for parliament again.

Electoral record

References

1848 births
1925 deaths
Liberal Party (UK) MPs for English constituencies
UK MPs 1910